The White Dacha is the house that Anton Chekhov had built in Yalta and in which he wrote some of his greatest work. It is now a writer's house museum.

Building
The White Dacha was built in 1898 following Chekhov's success with The Seagull. He took up residence there after his father's death and to aid him with coping with tuberculosis. Chekhov planted a variety of trees including mulberry, cherry, almond, peach, cypress, citrus, acacia and birch. He also planted roses such as 'Cheshunt Hybrid', 'Cramoisi Supérieur', 'Gloire de Dijon', 'La France', 'Madame Joseph Schwartz', 'Madame Lombard', 'Princesse de Sagan', Rosa banksiae f. 'Lutea', 'Souvenir de la Malmaison', 'Turner's Crimson Rambler'..., and kept dogs and tame cranes.

The house was designed by L.N. Shapovalov. Aleksandr Kuprin described the house as follows,

It was, perhaps, the most original building in Yalta. It is all white, pure, easy, beautifully asymmetrical, ... with a tower, and unexpected ledges, with a glass veranda below and an open terrace above, with scattered broad and narrow windows... ".

V.N. Ladygensky mentioned that "a dacha in Crimea, in Аutka, near Yalta, was validly constructed, excellent".
From the study one can see the seafront that inspired "The Lady with the Dog", and at the back the scene that inspired the setting of The Cherry Orchard is visible. He also wrote the Three Sisters and The Bishop on the site.

Museum

After Chekhov's death (1904) the house was looked after by his sister, Masha, until 1921 when it became a museum. During the Nazi occupation Maria Pavlovna refused to leave and put up pictures of Hauptmann (the German dramatist) any "a...dramatist" on the wall and refused to let a German officer move into her brother's rooms. Nothing went missing but the house was damaged by one of the last air raids on the area by the Luftwaffe.

Museum funding issues 
The Soviet government, as with other such heritage sites, diligently looked after the house but following the dissolution of the Soviet Union, the responsibility for the house's upkeep came under dispute. Crimea became an autonomous republic within Ukraine. The museum falls under the jurisdiction of the Ministry of Culture of the Crimean Autonomous Republic and their budget is extremely small. The Ukrainian state authorities would like the Russian government to pay for upkeep since Chekhov was Russian, but the Russians do not agree. The house has now become dilapidated. On May 11, 2010, Ukrainian President, Viktor Yanukovych, ordered that repairs and restoration work be carried out on the house.

Noted visitors

Chekhov was a noted host and entertained Leo Tolstoy, Feodor Chaliapin, Sergei Rachmaninoff, and Maxim Gorky at the Dacha. Leonid Kuchma and Vladimir Putin and their spouses visited the museum in 2003.

See also
Birthhouse of Anton Chekhov
Melikhovo, home and museum

References

Further sources
 Bartlett, Rosamund (2004) Chekhov: Scenes from a Life (London: Free Press)
 Chute, Patricia (1998) "Anton Chekhov: The House in Yalta and the Final Years", Harvard Review, No. 15 (Fall), pp. 119–123

External links
Anton Chekhov Foundation (UK charity No 1128310)

Museums in Crimea
Houses in Ukraine
Anton Chekhov
Dachas
Buildings and structures in Yalta
Biographical museums in Ukraine
Literary museums in Ukraine
Cultural heritage monuments of federal significance in Crimea